Daniel Menasce from the George Mason University was named Fellow of the Institute of Electrical and Electronics Engineers (IEEE) in 2014 for contributions to research and education in performance evaluation of computer systems.

References

External links
GMU Bio

Fellow Members of the IEEE
Living people
George Mason University faculty
Year of birth missing (living people)
Place of birth missing (living people)
American electrical engineers